Michael Black may refer to:
Michael Black (footballer) (born 1976), former English footballer
Michael Black (judge) (born 1940), former Chief Justice of the Federal Court of Australia
Mike Black (offensive lineman) (born 1964), American football player
Mike Black (punter) (born 1961), American football player
Mike Black (kicker) (born 1969), American football player
Michael Ian Black (born 1971), American comedian, actor, and writer
Michael J. Black (born 1962), American-born computer scientist
Michael Black (literary critic) (born 1928), British literary critic and writer
Michael Black (sculptor) (1928–2019), British sculptor